Kollo may refer to:

People
 Kollo Daniel Sanou (born 1951), Burkinabé film director
 Kristo Kollo (born 1990), Estonian volleyball player
 René Kollo (born 1937), German tenor
 Walter Kollo (1878–1940), German composer

Places
 Churi Kollo or Churi Qullu, Peru
 , Burkina Faso
 , Burkina Faso
 , Burkina Faso
 
 Kollo, Niger